The 2014 Queensland Handball League is a Brisbane based championship for Handball. It is a home and away structure conducted in March to May 2014, with the winning team qualifying for the National Club Championship.

The University of Queensland Firsts team won the competition from the University of Queensland Seconds team. The defending champions Logan Wizards came third. 2013 runners up Northern Panthers were fourth with Griffith Vikings fifth.

The Junior competition was run by Northern Panthers Handball Association and featured three mixed boys and girls teams won by North Brisbane.

Standings

Men's Open

Northern University Games - Mixed

Junior Mixed

External links
 Results on QLD Uni webpage 
 Results on Uni Games web page

Handball competitions in Australia
2014 in Australian sport
2014–15 domestic handball leagues